Kokdu: Season of Deity is an ongoing South Korean television series starring Kim Jung-hyun, Im Soo-hyang, Kim Da-som, Ahn Woo-yeon, Kim In-kwon, and Cha Chung-hwa. It premiered on January 27, 2023 on MBC TV, and airs every Friday and Saturday at 21:50 (KST). It is also available for streaming on IQIYI, Viki, Viu and Wavve in selected regions.

Synopsis
The series is about a grim reaper named Kokdu (Kim Jung-hyun) who visits the mortal world every 99 years to punish humans. He meets Dr. Han Gye-jeol (Im Soo-hyang), a doctor with mysterious abilities, and starts working as a visiting doctor.

Cast

Main
 Kim Jung-hyun as Kokdu / Do Jin-woo / Oh-hyeon
 Kokdu: an underworld god who has been cursed to lead the deceased in the afterlife after angering the Creator, and has to enter a human body that looks just like him to carry out the murders of immoral people.
 Do Jin-woo: a successful surgeon and Gye-jeol's fellow hospital worker who is possessed by Kokdu.
 Oh-hyeon: Seol-hee's lover who was cursed by the Creator to become Kokdu.
 Im Soo-hyang as Han Gye-jeol / Seol-hee
 Han Gye-jeol: an ER doctor who graduated from the lowest-ranking medical school in the country.
 Seol-hee: Gye-jeol's past life who is a princess whom loved by Oh-hyeon for a long time.
 Kim Da-som as Tae Jeong-won
 A talented woman who never missed the first rank from the time she entered Korea University of Medicine until graduation.
 Ahn Woo-yeon as Han Cheol
 Gye-jeol's younger brother who is a detective.
 Kim In-kwon as Oksin / Lee Eung-chul
 A demigod whose purpose of existence is to assist Kokdu. In human world, he is posing as a chaebol.
 Cha Chung-hwa as Gaksin / Seo Bok-gyeong
 The god of rumor with the highest level of nunchi. In human world, she is posing as a YouTube influencer, and later a nurse.

Supporting

Pilseong Bio
 Choi Kwang-il as Kim Pil-soo
 Chairman of Pilseong Hospital.
 Kim Young-woong as Jung-sik
 Pil-soo's shadow who is a murderer with fourteen convictions.

People in Yeongpo City
 Lee Jung-joon as Jung Yi-deun
 Gye-jeol's ex-boyfriend.
 Kim Byeong-ok as Shin Hong-geun
 Owner of Yongwang-nim Samgyeopsal.
 Oh Young-sil as Oh Kyung-seung
 Hong-geun's wife.
 Lee Young-ran as Moon Myung-ja
 CEO of Yeongpo Jongga Co.
 Woo Hyun as Choi Dal-seung
 Myung-ja's husband who is the president of Yeongpo Small Business Association.
 Kim Byeong-chun as Bae Jeong-guk
 Manager of Fire Fist Gym.
 Min Jun-ho as Detective Kim
 A homicide detective.

Pilseong Hospital
 Son So-mang as Sa Guk-hwa
 Jeong-won's friend who is a nurse at Pilseong Hospital.

Extended
 Jung Ah-mi as Jang Mi-soon
 Jin-woo's biological mother who is a professor of Hepatobiliary and Pancreatic Surgery at Pilseong Hospital.
 Oh Yeon-ah as Ji Soo-yeon
 A doctor at Pilseong Hospital.
 Park Shin-woo as Jo Bong-pil
 A pharmacist who does not hesitate to commit illegal and evil acts.
 Jung Wook as Park Chung-seong

Special appearances
 Jung Young-joo as a deceased patient's daughter
 Sung Byeong-sook as a patient
 Kim Kang-hoon as the Creator
 Yoo Jae-suk as an employee
 Jeong Jun-ha as an employee
 Lee Mi-joo as an employee
 Wang Bit-na as Gye-jeol's mother

Production
Filming of the series had started by September 2022.

Hangout with Yoo cast members Yoo Jae-suk, Jeong Jun-ha and Lee Mi-joo made cameo appearances on Kokdu: Season of Deity as part of the variety show's "HWY HR" segment. The filming of their scene with lead actress Im Soo-hyang was conducted in Ganghwa County, and was broadcast on the show on October 22, 2022.

On October 31, 2022, the production team announced that filming for the series was halted due to the death of actor Lee Ji-han who died on October 29 during the Seoul Halloween crowd crush tragedy, and would resume at a later date after reorganization. It was reported that Lee took the role of Jung Yi-deun, the ex-boyfriend of Im Soo-hyang's character. On November 7, an official from MBC confirmed that filming would resume on that day, and the production team decided to find a replacement for the late actor after much deliberation. It was later announced that  would join the cast, taking over Lee Ji-han's role.

Release
The series was initially scheduled to premiere at the end of 2022, but was pushed back to January 2023.

Original soundtrack

Part 1

Viewership

Notes

References

External links
  
 
 
 

Korean-language television shows
MBC TV television dramas
South Korean fantasy television series
South Korean romance television series
Television series by Story TV
2023 South Korean television series debuts